Spheroid Hill is a mostly ice-free summit (1,230 m) 1 nautical mile (1.9 km) east of Ellipsoid Hill, on the north side of Blue Glacier in Victoria Land. The name is one of a group in the area associated with surveying applied in 1993 by New Zealand Geographic Board (NZGB). Named from spheroid (sometimes referred to as an ellipsoid), a mathematical figure formed by revolving an ellipse about its minor axis.

Mountains of Victoria Land
Scott Coast